Alfred Charles Barker (1819–1873) was a New Zealand doctor and photographer. 

Barker was born on 5 January 1819 at Hackney, London in England. Barker was the fifth child of Joseph Gibbs Barker and Sarah Pritchett Bousfield.  He studied medicine at King's College, London. He and his wife Emma (née Bacon) arrived at Lyttelton on the Charlotte Jane on 16 December 1850 and settled in Christchurch, where they had five children.

Barker died on 20 March 1873 and was buried in the Barbadoes Street Cemetery.

References

External links

Dr Alfred Charles Barker | Cantage – Canterbury Heritage
Open Calais – Person | Alfred Charles Barker
Alfred Charles Barker | NZETC

19th-century New Zealand medical doctors
New Zealand photographers
1819 births
1873 deaths
Canterbury Pilgrims
English emigrants to New Zealand
People from Christchurch
Burials at Barbadoes Street Cemetery
19th-century English photographers
Photographers from Berkshire